Jon Luke Kirby (born 23 September 1998) is a professional rugby league footballer who plays as a  or  forward for the York Knights in the RFL Championship. He had previously played for the Huddersfield Giants.

He has spent time on loan from Huddersfield Giants at Hunslet in Betfred League 1, Halifax and Dewsbury Rams in the Betfred Championship.

In 2019 he made his Super League début for the Giants against Hull F.C.

On 11 November 2022 it was announced that Kirby had joined the York Knights.

References

External links
Huddersfield Giants profile
SL profile

1998 births
Living people
Dewsbury Rams players
English rugby league players
Halifax R.L.F.C. players
Huddersfield Giants players
Hunslet R.L.F.C. players
Rugby league players from Yorkshire
Rugby league props
Rugby league second-rows
York City Knights players